In enzymology, a L-dopachrome isomerase is an enzyme that catalyzes the chemical reaction

L-dopachrome  5,6-dihydroxyindole-2-carboxylate

Hence, this enzyme has one substrate, L-dopachrome, and one product, 5,6-dihydroxyindole-2-carboxylate.

This enzyme belongs to the family of isomerases, specifically those intramolecular oxidoreductases transposing C=C bonds.  The systematic name of this enzyme class is L-dopachrome keto-enol isomerase. Other names in common use include dopachrome tautomerase, tyrosinase-related protein 2, TRP-1, TRP2, TRP-2, tyrosinase-related protein-2, dopachrome Delta7,Delta2-isomerase, dopachrome Delta-isomerase, dopachrome conversion factor, dopachrome isomerase, dopachrome oxidoreductase, dopachrome-rearranging enzyme, DCF, DCT, dopachrome keto-enol isomerase, and L-dopachrome-methyl ester tautomerase.  This enzyme participates in tyrosine metabolism and melanogenesis.

References

 
 
 

EC 5.3.3
Enzymes of unknown structure